Queanbeyan City Football Club is an Australian amateur association football club based in the NSW city of Queanbeyan, Australia. The club was founded in 1966 and currently competes in ACT competitions including the ACT Capital League.

History

The club was established in 1966 as Queanbeyan Makedonia by Done Dimov, Angelo Hadzis and Vic Tsalakos.  The club registered with the ACT Soccer Federation on 17 March 1966 and entered the ACT Second Division. However, Hungaria was forced to fold and Queanbeyan was chosen to replace the club in the first division.

The Lions spent a number of years in the first division with the club finishing runner-up in the league in both 1969 and 1970. Queanbeyan was ten minutes from claiming the 1969 championship with the club 2–1 up over Olympic with ten minutes to play. The match was abandoned after eighty minutes due to fighting and the ACT Soccer Federation chose not to replay the match.

Macedonia won its first titles in the 1970s with two-second division league premierships in 1973 and 1978 as well as the ‘78 finals championship.

QCFC enjoyed considerable success in the ACT Second Division in the 1980s as well as when the completion was re-branded State League One in the 1990s. A number of titles were lifted including three premierships in 1988, 1993 and 1995 as well as two championships in 1990 and 95.

In 2013, Capital Football introduced a revamped second division of men's football in the ACT, coinciding with the introduction of the National Premier Leagues (NPL) as the overhauled top divisions nationwide. The revamped second division was named the Capital League. Queanbeyan City was a founding member of the Capital League, which in 2013 consisted of two groups of six teams. The Lions finished its maiden Capital League season as runner-up in group B, qualifying for the finals series. City beat Lanyon United 3–0 in the quarter finals and then White Eagles 3–2 in the semi-finals before losing to Narrabundah 3–5 on penalties in the grand final.

February 2016, Queanbeyan City, Queanbeyan's longest running football club, celebrated its fifty-year anniversary with a gala night and a mini football tournament attended by City along with clubs from Sydney, southern NSW and the ACT.

Club identity

Macedonian Heritage

Queanbeyan City was established by the local Macedonian community with Macedonian players, staff and members comprising the majority of the club. QCFC has participated regularly in the national annual Macedonian cup tournament, the Maso Cup, with other clubs around Australia with links to Macedonia including Broadmeadow Magic, Altona Magic and Wollongong United among others.

Colours and crest

The Lions colours of red, yellow and black draw inspiration from the club's Macedonian heritage.

Club name

The club was founded as Queanbeyan Makedonia in 1966 by the local Macedonian community which settled in Queanbeyan. After three years the club name was updated to Queanbeyan Macedonia in 1969. Finally, in 1973 the club changed its name to Queanbeyan City, which it has retained as its name since that point.

Junior Program

Queanbeyan City run an extensive junior and youth program with boys and girls teams ranging from miniroos (u5s to u10) to juniors (u12 – u16s).

Current squad
1 J. Miller
5 B. Moore
3 I. Pucoski
4 M. Ryan
2 M. Walker
6 T. Angelkoski
11 J. Kerszberg
10 A. Lazarov
8 I. Nedeski
9 D. McCarron
7 N. Trajkovski
15 G. Josifovski
16 K. Josifovski
12 V. Petrovski
14 M. Savkovic
13 S. Srbinoski

Honours

ACT NPL League Premiers and Finals Champions
Premiers (0):
Runner-up (2): 1969, 1970
Champions (0): 1969 Final was abandoned due to fighting after 80  with Queanbeyan 2–1 up over Olympic at the time. Cup was not awarded.

ACT Capital League Premiers and Finals Champions
Capital Premier LeaguePremiers (6): 1973, 1978, 1988, 1993, 1995, 2006
Runner-up (5): 1991, 2005, 2010, 2012, 2013Champions (5): 1978, 1990, 1995, 2006, 2010, 2018
Runner-up (4): 2005, 2012, 2013, 2016Capital Football Federation CupWinners (1):''' 1969

Season-by-season results

The below table is updated with the statistics and final results for Queanbeyan City FC following the conclusion of each ACT Capital League season.

See also

 Macedonian Australians
 Soccer in the Australian Capital Territory

References

External links
 Official website
 Official Facebook page
 Capital Football home

Association football clubs established in 1966
1966 establishments in Australia
Soccer clubs in Canberra
Soccer clubs in New South Wales
Queanbeyan
Macedonian sports clubs in Australia